Dino Ben Visser (born 10 July 1989) is a South African footballer who plays as a goalkeeper for  club Hereford.

He began his career with Platinum Stars in his native country South Africa, making his Premier Soccer League debut in March 2011. Visser was touted as one of the most exciting young prospects from South Africa for some time. Visser played for Bloemfontein Celtic, Black Leopards and Polokwane City and picked up a winners medal when Bloemfontein Celtic won the 2012 Telkom Knockout. He was the regular first-team goalkeeper at Santos during the 2016–17 season. Despite this, the club were relegated out of the National First Division. He returned to the top-flight with former club Platinum Stars the next season as the regular first-choice goalkeeper and remained as such when Platinum Stars was sold and renamed to Cape Umoya United.

In June 2019, Visser decided to move to England and eventually signed a short-term deal at Exeter City. After the expiration of his deal he left the club to instead sign a short term deal with Crewe Alexandra in March 2020. He signed a deal with Port Vale five months later, but left the club after spending the second half of the 2020–21 season out injured. He signed with Hereford in September 2022.

Career

South Africa
Visser began his career with Platinum Stars, where head coach Steve Komphela described him and fellow youngster Allan Thomas as "good, up-and-coming young goalkeepers". In 2010, Visser featured for Platinum Stars in a friendly against England, as part of their preparations for the 2010 World Cup. Visser made his first-team debut under the stewardship of Owen Da Gama on 5 March 2011, keeping a clean sheet and the earning man of the match award in a 0–0 draw with SuperSport United at the Royal Bafokeng Stadium in the Premier Soccer League, with regular custodian Tapuwa Kapini suspended. This would prove to be his only appearance for the "Dikwena" however as he refused to sign a new three-year deal with the club and instead chose to become a free agent in the summer. He moved on to Bloemfontein Celtic and was an unused substitute in the 2012 Telkom Knockout final, as Celtic beat Mamelodi Sundowns 3–0 at the Moses Mabhida Stadium.

He was loaned out to National First Division side Black Leopards for the 2013–14 season. He played 16 games to help Kosta Papić's "Lidoda Duvha" to record a second-place finish, though they missed out on promotion as they went on to lose to Polokwane City in the play-offs; Visser entered the game as a 31st-minute replacement for Jacob Mokhasi, with the Leopards already two goals down, and his outstanding saves were too late to sway the game. Visser then signed with Polokwane City and started as first choice in head coach Boebie Solomons' plans for the 2014–15 season as Botswana international Modiri Marumo was waiting on a work permit. He only played 11 games for the club after falling out with the club ownership structure, who came out to deny rumours that he had been released midway through the 2015–16 season.

Visser joined Santos in August 2016. He played 24 games during the 2016–17 season, though the "People's Team" would be relegated down to the SAFA Second Division in last place. He rejoined Platinum Stars in August 2017, signing a two-year deal, to compete with Mwenya Chibwe, Steven Hoffman and Mbongeni Mzimela for a place in Peter Butler's starting eleven. Stars finished second-bottom of the South African Premier Division and were relegated; Visser featured a total of 21 times, including playing in all the play-off matches. The Platinum Stars entity was sold and renamed Cape Umoya United, who were aiming for promotion under head coach Roger De Sá. He featured 24 times in the 2018–19 campaign, though the "Spirited Ones" could only manage a tenth-place finish.

England
Following the expiration of his Cape Umoya United contract at the end of the 2018–19 National First Division season, Visser moved to England. He went on trial with Charlton Athletic in July 2019, but ultimately the "Addicks" instead opted to sign Ben Amos. In October, he joined EFL League Two club Exeter City on a short-term deal, who were missing Lewis Ward with a broken arm. Visser made his debut for the club in a 3–1 victory over West Ham United U21 at St James Park in the group stage of the EFL Trophy. In the following round, Visser kept a clean sheet against League One promotion contenders Oxford United, incredibly saving all three of Oxford's penalties in the ensuing penalty shootout – a performance which earned him the tournament's 'Player of the Round' award. Following on from the expiration of Visser's short-term contract and a second injury to Jonny Maxted, Visser was offered the chance to return to the "Grecians" in February, however he rejected this, and the following month joined EFL League Two rivals Crewe Alexandra and promotion favourites on a short-term deal to the end of the 2019–20 season.

He signed for League Two club Port Vale on 27 August 2020 after impressing manager John Askey on trial, who hoped he would challenge established number one Scott Brown for a first-team place. He made his debut against Tranmere Rovers at Vale Park on 8 September, keeping a clean sheet and then saving three penalties in the shoot-out to secure two points for the "Valiants" in the group stages of the EFL Trophy. However he was deregistered at the end of the January transfer window after he was sidelined with a hamstring injury. Both Brown and Visser were released at the end of the 2020–21 season by new manager Darrell Clarke.

Hereford
On 23 September 2022, Visser signed for National League North club Hereford following an injury to on-loan goalkeeper Harvey Wiles-Richards.

Career statistics

Honours
Bloemfontein Celtic
Telkom Knockout: 2012

References

1989 births
Living people
People from Polokwane
Sportspeople from Limpopo
South African soccer players
Association football goalkeepers
Platinum Stars F.C. players
Bloemfontein Celtic F.C. players
Black Leopards F.C. players
Polokwane City F.C. players
Santos F.C. (South Africa) players
Cape Umoya United F.C. players
Exeter City F.C. players
Crewe Alexandra F.C. players
Port Vale F.C. players
Hereford F.C. players
South African Premier Division players
National First Division players
National League (English football) players
South African expatriate soccer players
Expatriate footballers in England
South African expatriate sportspeople in England